Amber Brown (born December 14, 1988) is an American mixed martial arts (MMA) fighter in the Atomweight weight class.

Fight Matrix has almost continually ranked Brown as a top fifteen women's atomweight, having ranked her as high as #5 in October 2015.

Mixed martial arts career

Early career
Brown made her professional debut against Ashley Aguirre at KOTC Final Countdown. She won the fight by a unanimous decision. Brown won her second fight with KOTC as well, beating Abby Higginbotham by a first-round TKO at KOTC Curtain Call.

Brown was scheduled to fight Emi Fujino at Pancrase 247, as a late replacement for Monica Lovato, who had to withdraw following a car accident. Fujino won the fight by a second-round neck crank submission.

Brown was scheduled to fight Kikuyo Ishikawa at Pancrase 250. Brown won the fight by a third-round armbar submission.

Invicta
For her Invicta debut, Brown was scheduled to fight Liz McCarthy at Invicta FC 9: Honchak vs. Hashi. She won the fight by split decision.

Brown was scheduled to fight Catherine Costigan at Invicta FC 13: Cyborg vs. Van Duin. She won the fight by a first round submission.

Brown was scheduled to fight Shino VanHoose at Invicta FC 15: Cyborg vs. Ibragimova. Brown won the fight by a first-round guillotine choke.

Her three fight winning streak earned Brown the chance to challenge the reigning Invicta Atomweight champion Ayaka Hamasaki, at Invicta FC 16: Hamasaki vs. Brown. Hamasaki won the fight by a third-round armbar submission.

Brown was next scheduled to fight Ashley Yoder at Invicta FC 20: Evinger vs. Kunitskaya. Brown lost the fight by a second round submission. Brown was scheduled to fight Ashley Cummins at Invicta FC 22: Evinger vs. Kunitskaya II. Cummins won the fight by unanimous decision, extending Brown's losing streak to three fights.

Brown snapped her losing streak at Invicta FC 26: Maia vs. Niedzwiedz, submitting Tessa Simpson with an armbar, 50 seconds into the fight.

Brown was scheduled to fight Alesha Zappitella at Invicta FC 33: Frey vs. Grusander II. Zappitella won the fight by unanimous decision.

Brown participated in the Invicta Phoenix Series 1 strawweight tournament. She was scheduled to face Sharon Jacobson in the quarterfinals, as a late replacement for Mizuki Inoue, who was pulled from the card due to weigh-cut complications. Jacobson won the fight by unanimous decision.

Brown was scheduled to fight a rematch with Sharon Jacobson at Invicta FC: Phoenix Series 3. Brown later withdrew from the bout for undisclosed reasons.

Post Invicta
After three years away from MMA, Brown was scheduled to make her return and debut for LFA against Pauline Macias in July 2022. Brown withdrew from the fight after her daughter became ill. 

Brown was scheduled to fight veteran Celine Haga on March 11, 2023 for Fight World MMA. However the day before the event, Haga withdrew due to illness and the bout was cancelled.

Championships and accomplishments
Awakening Fighters
2015 Fan Favourite Atomweight of the Year

Mixed martial arts record

|-
| Loss
| align=center| 7–5
| Alesha Zappitella
| Decision (unanimous)
| Invicta FC 33: Frey vs. Grusander II
| 
| align=center| 3
| align=center| 5:00
| Kansas City, Missouri
| 
|-
| Win
| align=center| 7–4
| Tessa Simpson
| Submission (armbar)
| Invicta FC 26: Maia vs. Niedzwiedz
| 
| align=center| 1
| align=center| 0:50
| Kansas City, Missouri
| 
|-
| Loss
| align=center| 6–4
| Ashley Cummins
| Decision (unanimous)
| Invicta FC 22: Evinger vs. Kunitskaya II
| 
| align=center| 3
| align=center| 5:00
| Kansas City, Missouri
| 
|-
| Loss
| align=center| 6–3
| Ashley Yoder
| Submission (armbar)
| Invicta FC 20: Evinger vs. Kunitskaya
| 
| align=center| 2
| align=center| 2:31
| Kansas City, Missouri
| 
|-
| Loss
| align=center| 6–2
| Ayaka Hamasaki
| Submission (armbar)
| Invicta FC 16: Hamasaki vs. Brown
| 
| align=center| 3
| align=center| 2:52
| Las Vegas, Nevada
| <small>For the Invicta FC Atomweight Championship.
|-
| Win
| align=center| 6–1
| Shino VanHoose
| Submission (guillotine choke)
| Invicta FC 15: Cyborg vs. Ibragimova
| 
| align=center| 1
| align=center| 2:36
| Costa Mesa, California
|
|-
| Win
| align=center| 5–1
| Catherine Costigan
| Submission (rear-naked choke)
| Invicta FC 13: Cyborg vs. Van Duin
| 
| align=center| 1
| align=center| 3:34
| Las Vegas, Nevada
|
|-
| Win
| align=center| 4–1
| Liz McCarthy
| Decision (split)
| Invicta FC 9: Honchak vs. Hashi
| 
| align=center| 3
| align=center| 5:00
| Davenport, Iowa
|
|-
| Win
| align=center| 3–1
| Kikuyo Ishikawa
| Submission (armbar)
| Pancrase 250
| 
| align=center| 3
| align=center| 3:27
| Tokyo, Japan
|
|-
| Loss
| align=center| 2–1
| Emi Fujino
| Submission (neck crank)
| Pancrase 247
| 
| align=center| 2
| align=center| 4:18
| Tokyo, Japan
|
|-
| Win
| align=center| 2–0
| Abby Higginbotham
| TKO (punches)
| KOTC Curtain Call
| 
| align=center| 1
| align=center| 2:24
| Norman, Oklahoma
|
|-
| Win
| align=center| 1–0
| Ashley Aguirre
| Decision (unanimous)
| KOTC Final Countdown
| 
| align=center| 3
| align=center| 5:00
| Santa Fe, New Mexico
|

Mixed martial arts exhibition record

|-
| Loss
| align=center| 7–5
| Sharon Jacobson
| Decision (unanimous)
| Invicta Phoenix Series 1
| 
| align=center| 1
| align=center| 5:00
| Kansas City, Kansas
| Invicta FC Strawweight Tournament Quarterfinal
|-

See also
 List of female mixed martial artists
 List of current Invicta FC fighters

References

External links
 
 Amber Brown at Invicta FC

1988 births
Mixed martial artists from New Mexico
Sportspeople from Albuquerque, New Mexico
American female mixed martial artists
Living people
Atomweight mixed martial artists
Strawweight mixed martial artists
21st-century American women